The women's 800 metres sprint competition of the athletics events at the 1979 Pan American Games took place on 8 and 9 July at the Estadio Sixto Escobar. The defending Pan American Games champion was Kathy Weston of the United States.

Records
Prior to this competition, the existing world and Pan American Games records were as follows:

Results
All times shown are in minutes and seconds.

Heats

Final

References

Athletics at the 1979 Pan American Games
1979